This is a list of properties and historic districts on the National Register of Historic Places within the city limits of St. Louis, Missouri, north of Interstate 64 and west of Downtown St. Louis. For listings in Downtown St. Louis, see National Register of Historic Places listings in Downtown and Downtown West St. Louis. For those south of I-64 and west of downtown, see National Register of Historic Places listings in St. Louis south and west of downtown. For listings in St. Louis County and outside the city limits of St. Louis, see National Register of Historic Places listings in St. Louis County, Missouri.

Current listings

|}

References

North
St. Louis-related lists